Low Blow is an album by Victor Bailey	released in 1999. "Graham Cracker" is a tribute to Larry Graham.

Track listing
All tracks composed by Victor Bailey; except where noted.
 "Low Blow" – 	3:11
 "Sweet Tooth" – 	5:58
 "City Living" – 	6:11
 "Do You Know Who/Continuum" (music: Jaco Pastorius; lyrics: Victor Bailey) – 	5:17
 "Knee-Jerk Reaction" – 	7:25
 "She Left Me" – 	5:03
 "Graham Cracker" – 	5:40
 "Babytalk" – 	5:53
 "Feels Like a Hug" – 	5:26
 "Brain Teaser" – 	7:20

Personnel

Victor Bailey – synthesizer, bass, arranger, keyboards, vocals, producer, synthesizer bass, Mu-Tron	
Jim Beard – guitar, keyboards, Fender Rhodes, wah wah guitar, Wurlitzer, grand piano
Michael Bearden – piano, keyboards	
Dennis Chambers – drums	
Bill Evans – soprano saxophone
Kenny Garrett – soprano saxophone	
Omar Hakim – drums	
Henry Hey – keyboards	
Wayne Krantz – guitar
Technical
Eddie "Samba Agau" Francois  – photography

Production

Joachim Becker  – Executive Producer
Ted Jensen  – Mastering
Andy Katz  – Engineer
John Montagnese  – Assistant Engineer
Joe Peccerillo  – Assistant Engineer
Ricky Schultz  – Executive Producer
Bob Trier  – Design, Cover Design

References

1999 albums